Baldone is a town in Ķekava Municipality in the Semigallia region of Latvia. The town is famous for its sulfur water springs and was a spa resort.

Viktors Arājs was born there in 1910.

Gallery

See also
List of cities in Latvia

References

Towns in Latvia
Populated places established in 1991
1991 establishments in Latvia
Ķekava Municipality
Semigallia